The Drury-Austin House is a historic home located at Boyds, Montgomery County, Maryland. It is a -story dwelling comprising two sections: a late-18th-century one-room plan log house (the southern half), which was doubled in size by the addition of a one-room timber-frame section in the early 19th century. The house is exemplary of the type of dwelling that characterized western Montgomery County in the earliest phase of its settlement.

It was listed on the National Register of Historic Places in 1986.

References

External links
, including undated photo, at Maryland Historical Trust website

Houses completed in 1768
Houses in Montgomery County, Maryland
Houses on the National Register of Historic Places in Maryland
National Register of Historic Places in Montgomery County, Maryland
1768 establishments in Maryland